Sosylus costatus is a species of dry bark beetle in the family Bothrideridae. It is found in North America.

References

Further reading

 

Bothrideridae
Articles created by Qbugbot
Beetles described in 1863
Beetles of North America